Suprarenal artery may refer to:
 Inferior suprarenal artery (arteria suprarenalis inferior)
 Middle suprarenal arteries (arteria suprarenalis media)
 Superior suprarenal artery (arteria suprarenalis superior)